Acupalpus bifossulatus is an insect-eating ground beetle of the genus Acupalpus.

References 

bifossulatus
Beetles described in 1849